Lysyl oxidase homolog 4 is an enzyme that in humans is encoded by the LOXL4 gene.

This gene encodes a member of the lysyl oxidase gene family. The prototypic member of the family is essential to the biogenesis of connective tissue, encoding an extracellular copper-dependent amine oxidase that catalyses the first step in the formation of crosslinks in collagens and elastin. A highly conserved amino acid sequence at the C-terminus end appears to be sufficient for amine oxidase activity, suggesting that each family member may retain this function. The N-terminus is poorly conserved and may impart additional roles in developmental regulation, senescence, tumor suppression, cell growth control, and chemotaxis to each member of the family.

See also
 LOXL1
 LOXL2
 LOXL3

References

Further reading

Lysyl oxidases